Acronicta major is a moth of the family Noctuidae. It is found in the Korean Peninsula, China to Tibet, Japan, the Russian Far East (Primorye, Khabarovsk, Amur region, Sakhalin, southern Kuriles), southern Siberia (Altai), northern India and Nepal.

Subspecies
Acronicta major major
Acronicta major atritaigensa (southern West Siberia)

External links
Korean Insects
New taxa of Acronictinae (Lepidoptera, Noctuidae) from the mountains of South Siberia

Acronicta
Moths of Asia
Moths described in 1861